Diya TV is an American broadcast television network that was founded in 2009 by Ravi Kapur, an award-winning journalist, and is based in San Francisco, California. It is the widest distributed Asian American owned and themed television network in the United States, reaching in excess of 70 million people over the air.

Diya TV provides programming geared toward Indian American and South Asian interests in the United States, with programming rooted in news and investigative journalism in English, Hindi and Punjabi.

Ravi Kapur was the former owner of KAXT-CD in San Francisco, which was formerly affiliated with Diya TV. Diya TV is referred to as "America’s first and only South Asian broadcast television network".

List of affiliates
WRJK-LD - Arlington Heights, Illinois
KLEG-CD - Dallas, Texas
KMMC-LD - San Francisco, California
KAAP-LD - San Jose, California
WLVO-LD - Atlanta, Georgia
WSWF-LD - Orlando, Florida
KFLA - Los Angeles, California
WISH-TV - Indianapolis, Indiana
WNYX/WXNY - New York, New York
KQHO - Houston, Texas
WHNE - Detroit, Michigan
KBBV-CD - Bakersfield, California

Former affiliates
KAXT-CD - San Francisco, California
WRNT-LD - Hartford, Connecticut
WCRN-LD - Providence, Rhode Island
KBID - Fresno, California

References

External links
Diya TV website

Asia Television
Companies of Southeast Asia
2009 establishments in Southeast Asia